Gir Zerk  (also known in Arabic as al-Adnaniyah) is a village located in the Sinjar District of the Ninawa Governorate in northern Iraq. The village is located south of the Sinjar Mount. It belongs to the disputed territories of Northern Iraq.

Gir Zerk has exclusively Yazidi population.

References 

Populated places in Nineveh Governorate
Yazidi populated places in Iraq